Newbury Football Club are a football club based in Newbury, Berkshire, England. They are currently members of the Hellenic League and play their homes games at the Lambourn Sports Ground.

History
Newbury was originally formed in 2002 as the Saturday side for A.F.C. Newbury and entered into the Reading League Division 4, winning it in its debut season. In the next two years, the club had won successive promotions and this culminated in arriving in Division 1 of the Reading League.

With pretty much the same squad, the club then won the Division 1 title and was asked to compete in the Reading Senior league, jumping a division, and having led the league for most of the season, and going 17 games unbeaten, the club finished second in the league on the final day of the season, in  game at Cookham Dean in which promotion was secured.
 
They joined the Hellenic Football League in 2008 and started in Division one east. Newbury became champions of Division one east in the 2011–12 season and won promotion to the Premier Division.

At the end of the 2014–15 season the club resigned from the Hellenic league for financial reasons and joined the Thames Valley Premier Football League.

Newbury won the 2018/19 Thames Valley Premier League Division One, collecting a total of 53 points from 20 games. Their final game of the season was a 7-2 home win against Eldon Celtic.

On 1 July 2019, Karl Curtis was announced as the new first team coach, taking over from Danny Langford who led the team to the Thames Valley Premier League Division One title and promotion in 2018/19.

Newbury made a positive start to the 2019/20 season, winning their first five games in the Thames Valley Premier League. Due to the Coronavirus pandemic all football below the National League was ended on 26 March 2020 and all results for the 2019/20 season were expunged. At the time of the decision, Newbury sat in sixth place in the Thames Valley Premier League (Premier Division) having collected 26 points from 13 games.

On 10 July 2021, the club announced Nicky Voller as the new manager of the first team, taking over from Rocky Rowbottom and Carl Jenner. John Goddard was named as the assistant manager. 

Following the restructure of the non-league football pyramid, Newbury FC were transferred to the Hellenic League Division Two South for the 2021/22 season.

Ground
Between 1963 and 2016, Newbury played at Faraday Road in Newbury. For the 2019–20 season, they moved to Henwick Worthy Sports Ground in Thatcham. Beginning in 2021, the club play their home games at Lambourn Sports Club.

On 14 August 2021, the buildings at the club's former ground in Faraday Road were destroyed by fire.

Honours
Thames Valley Premier League Division One
Champions 2018/19
Hellenic Football League Division One East
Champions 2011–12
Reading Senior league
Runners-up 2007–08
Reading Senior league Division One
Champions 2006–07

Records
FA Cup
Preliminary Round 2011–12
FA Vase
Second Round 2012–13

References

External links

 
Football clubs in England
Sport in Newbury, Berkshire
2002 establishments in England
Association football clubs established in 2002
Hellenic Football League
Thames Valley Premier Football League